Hélio Júnio Nunes de Castro (born 25 April 2000), simply known as Helinho, is a Brazilian professional footballer who plays for Red Bull Bragantino. Mainly an attacking midfielder, he can also play as a forward.

Club career

Born in Sertãozinho, Helinho entered São Paulo FC's youth ranks in 2012. On 3 May 2018, his contract was extended until April 2023. In April, he was called to the senior team for a league match against Paraná Clube.

On 4 November 2018, Helinho made his first team debut, coming on as a 46th-minute substitute for Anderson Martins and scoring a goal five minutes later in a 2–2 draw against Flamengo.

International career
On 6 October 2017, Helinho was called to the Brazil under-17 squad for the Under-17 World Cup as a replacement for the injured Vinícius Júnior. On 23 April 2018, he was called up to the Brazil under-20 team.

Career statistics

References

External links

2000 births
Living people
Association football forwards
Brazilian footballers
Campeonato Brasileiro Série A players
São Paulo FC players
Red Bull Bragantino players
Brazil youth international footballers
People from Sertãozinho